Great Britain, represented by the British Olympic Association (BOA), competed as the host nation of the 1908 Summer Olympics in London.  The British Olympic Association was the National Olympic Committee responsible for organising the United Kingdom's representation.  At the time British athletes competed under the team name "United Kingdom". The British team comprised 676 competitors.

It was the fourth appearance of the country, which has not missed any of the Summer Olympic Games. The country finished in the Olympic table in first place for the first and only time in its history. The Men's field hockey on the 31st of October is the last time that Great Britain swept the medal podium at an Olympics, as of 2022.

Medallists

Results by event

Archery

In the archery competition, the British team dominated the two events (one for men, one for women) popular in their country, winning both championships and second places as well as one third place, losing only a single bronze medal to the United States.  British women were the only ones to compete in the women's event.  Great Britain had 41 archers present, 25 women and 16 men; they totalled 42 entries over all three events held.

Brother and sister William and Lottie Dod took gold and silver medals, Queenie Newall taking the women's gold to become the oldest female gold medallist in Olympic history (a record she holds through the 2004 Summer Olympics), and the only Irish woman present at the 1908 Games won the women's bronze medal.

The British did not do as well in the Continental style, dominated by the French team, with the only Briton taking 12th place.  Robert Backhouse, however, shot a score in a friendly demonstration that would have placed him second had he been in actual competition.

Athletics

The British team was the second most successful team in athletics.  With 7 first-place finishes, they gathered less than half the championships that the American team did at 16, but still nearly doubled all other teams combined (4 gold medals).

Running

Jumping

Throwing

Boxing

Great Britain dominated the boxing competitions, taking 14 of the 15 medals including all 5 gold medals.

Cycling

Great Britain won 5 of a possible 7 gold medals in the cycling competitions, losing only the men's tandem to France and the men's sprint by exceeding the time limit (though a French cyclist finished first in that event as well).

Diving

Fencing

Great Britain took second in the men's team épée competition, with Montgomerie also making it into a three-way playoff for 2nd, 3rd and 4th places in the individual event despite having been nearly eliminated in both the second round and the semifinals.  His bottom placing in that playoff gave France a sweep of the medals.  The British were less successful in sabre, with no fencers making it to the final in the individual competition and the team being eliminated in the first round.

Figure skating

Football

England national amateur football team represented Great Britain in the football competition.

Gymnastics

Hockey

Great Britain sent four teams, one from each of the Home Nations.  Scotland and England defeated Germany and France, respectively, in the first round before facing each other in the semifinals.  Their victories assured them medals, while Ireland and Wales had been guaranteed medals by receiving byes in the first round.  England won in the semifinal against Scotland, while Ireland defeated Wales in the other semifinal.  The two losing teams received bronze medals, while England took the gold by winning the final against Ireland, who received silver.

Jeu de paume

In the jeu de paume competition, British players took the silver and bronze medals.

Lacrosse

Great Britain lost the only lacrosse match played in 1908 to Canada, earning the silver medal.

Polo

Great Britain was the only nation to compete in polo in 1908, with two English teams and an Irish team competing.

Rackets

The host nation was the only one to compete in rackets in 1908.

Rowing

Rugby

Great Britain lost the only rugby union match played in 1908 to Australasia, earning the silver medal.  The British representative was the Cornwall county team, which had won the 1907 county championships.

Sailing

Great Britain took all four of the sailing gold medals, without contest in the cases of the 7 metre class (where only one boat entered) and the 12 metre class (where both boats were British).

Shooting

Swimming

Tennis

Great Britain took all 6 gold medals in the lawn tennis competitions in 1908.

Tug of war

Great Britain sent three police teams to compete in tug of war in 1908.  They took the three medals, with the Liverpool police eliminating both foreign entrants (the United States in the only quarterfinal match and Sweden in the semifinals).  The City of London team defeated the Metropolitan police in the other semifinal, going on to defeat the Liverpool squad in the final.  The Metropolitan team won the bronze medal by default when the Swedes did not appear for the bronze match.

Water motorsports

Great Britain had a boat finish in each of two races in the water motorsports competitions, thereby winning two gold medals in the midst of a gale.  No British boat finished in the third race, leaving the final gold medal to France, which competed only in the open class.

Water polo

Wrestling

Notes

References

Sources
 
 
 

Nations at the 1908 Summer Olympics
1908
Olympics
Olympics